Bromothiophene may refer to:

 2-Bromothiophene
 3-Bromothiophene